Artem Putivtsev (born 29 August 1988) is a Ukrainian professional footballer who plays as a centre-back for Polish side Bruk-Bet Termalica Nieciecza.

Club career
Myron Markevych promoted Putivtsev to the senior team of Metalist Kharkiv for the 2009–10 season.

International career
Putivtsev was called up by Ukraine U21 and played for the team at 2011 UEFA European Under-21 Championship.

Personal life
On 15 October 2021, after staying in the country for over five years, Putivtsev obtained Polish citizenship.

References

External links
Official website profile (Rus)

1988 births
Living people
Footballers from Kharkiv
Ukrainian footballers
Ukrainian expatriate footballers
FC Metalist Kharkiv players
FC Hazovyk-KhGV Kharkiv players
FC Zirka Kropyvnytskyi players
FC Mariupol players
FC Metalurh Donetsk players
Bruk-Bet Termalica Nieciecza players
Ukrainian Premier League players
Ukrainian Second League players
Ekstraklasa players
I liga players
Ukraine under-21 international footballers
Ukraine international footballers
Association football midfielders
Expatriate footballers in Poland
Ukrainian expatriate sportspeople in Poland
Naturalized citizens of Poland